The Indian Express is an English-language Indian daily newspaper founded in 1932. It is published in Mumbai by the Indian Express Group. In 1999, eight years after the group's founder Ramnath Goenka's death in 1991, the group was split between the family members. The southern editions took the name The New Indian Express, while the northern editions, based in Mumbai, retained the original Indian Express name with "The" prefixed to the title.

History

In 1932, the Indian Express was started by an Ayurvedic doctor, P. Varadarajulu Naidu, at Chennai, being published by his "Tamil Nadu" press. Soon under financial difficulties, he sold the newspaper to Swaminathan Sadanand, the founder of The Free Press Journal, a national news agency. In 1933, the Indian Express opened its second office in Madurai, launching the Tamil edition, Dinamani. Sadanand introduced several innovations and reduced the price of the newspaper. Faced with financial difficulties, he sold a part of his stake to Ramanath Goenka as convertible debentures. In 1935, when The Free Press Journal finally collapsed, and after a protracted court battle with Goenka, Sadanand lost ownership of Indian Express. In 1939, Goenka bought Andhra Prabha, another prominent Telugu daily newspaper. The name Three Musketeers was often used for the three dailies namely, Indian Express, Dinamani and Andhra Prabha.

In 1940, the whole premises was gutted by fire. The Hindu, a rival newspaper, helped considerably in re-launching the paper, by getting it printed temporarily at one of its Swadesimithran's press and later offering its recently vacated premises at 2, Mount Road, on rent to Goenka, which later became the landmark Express Estates. This relocation also helped the Express obtain better high speed printing machines. The district judge who did inquiry into the fire concluded that a short circuit or a cigarette butt could have ignited the fire and said that the growing city had inadequate fire control support. In 1952, the paper had a circulation of 44,469.

After Ramnath Goenka's death in 1991, two of the grandsons, Manoj Kumar Sonthalia and Vivek Goenka split the group into two. Indian Express Mumbai with all the North Indian editions went to Vivek Goenka, and all the Southern editions which were grouped as Express Publications Madurai Limited with Chennai as headquarters went to MK Sonthalia. Indian Express began publishing daily on the internet on 8 July 1996. Five months later, the website expressindia.com attracted "700,000 hits every day, excepting weekends when it fell to 60% of its normal levels".

See also

 Ramnath Goenka Excellence in Journalism Awards
 Screen Awards

References

External links
 The Indian Express website
 

Publications established in 1931
1931 establishments in India
English-language newspapers published in India
Newspapers published in Kolkata
Newspapers published in Delhi
Newspapers published in Mumbai
Indian Express Limited
National newspapers published in India